Tabachana (Greek: Ταμπάχανα) is a neighbourhood and a settlement in the city of Patras.  The name is of Turkish origin named during the Ottoman period and it means tanning, Vyrsodepseia (Βυρσοδεψεία) in Greek, during the Ottoman period, it had tanning spots in the city and when the Greeks came as well as from other countries, today it is the most quietest neighbourhood in Patras with the homonymous square (Filiki Etaireia).

References
The first version of the article is translated and is based from the article at the Greek Wikipedia (el:Main Page)

Neighborhoods in Patras